Adolfo  Dávila García (born 1965) is a Mexican video and film director who has primarily directed short films and documentaries.

Awards
Dávila's short film Reves was named Best Experimental Film, and also captured the Grand Chameleon prize at the Brooklyn Film Festival in 2000.

Filmography
 Apizmiki (1989) (Documentary)
 Los Que Se Van (1991) (Documentary)
 OaxaCalifornia (1993) (Documentary)
 Raza (1993) (Documentary)
 Glimpses (1995) (Short Film)
 Merolicos, Magos, Músicos y Mentirosos (1997) (Documentary)
 Revés (1999) (Short Music Video Film for Mexican rock band Café Tacuba)
 El Álbum (2000) (Short Music Video Film for Colombian rock band Aterciopelados)
 Doble Jornada (2007) (Short Film)
 Lluvia de Ideas (2009) (Short Film)
 Los Dos Pérez (2009) (Short Film)
 El Refugio (2013) (Short Film)
 Tzu Kgosni / Niño Volador (Feature Film) (In Progress)

References

External links
 

1965 births
Living people
Mexican film directors
Spanish-language film directors
Mexican documentary filmmakers